Drag City may refer to:

"Drag City" (song), a 1963 song from Jan & Dean's album of the same name
Drag City, Jan and Dean discography 1963
Drag City (record label), an indie record label, film distributor, and book publisher

See also
 Drag, Norway, a village in Tysfjord municipality, Nordland, Norway
 Drág, the Hungarian name for Dragu Commune in Sălaj County, Romania